Fenton Park is an eastern suburb in Rotorua in the Bay of Plenty Region of New Zealand's North Island. Fenton Street contains Rotorua's main motel strip and is sometimes referred to as "Motel Mile".

 runs through the southern part of the suburb and  runs along the northeast boundary. Arawa Park racecourse is in the northern part. The Murray Linton Rose Garden, which opened in 1970, is a public park which was named after Murray Linton, a former mayor of Rotorua.

Demographics

Fenton Park had a population of 1,698 at the 2018 New Zealand census, an increase of 246 people (16.9%) since the 2013 census, and an increase of 303 people (21.7%) since the 2006 census. There were 693 households, comprising 807 males and 891 females, giving a sex ratio of 0.91 males per female. The median age was 38.9 years (compared with 37.4 years nationally), with 234 people (13.8%) aged under 15 years, 399 (23.5%) aged 15 to 29, 645 (38.0%) aged 30 to 64, and 420 (24.7%) aged 65 or older.

Ethnicities were 45.8% European/Pākehā, 31.6% Māori, 3.7% Pacific peoples, 29.3% Asian, and 0.9% other ethnicities. People may identify with more than one ethnicity.

The percentage of people born overseas was 33.6, compared with 27.1% nationally.

Although some people chose not to answer the census's question about religious affiliation, 29.3% had no religion, 40.6% were Christian, 2.1% had Māori religious beliefs, 7.4% were Hindu, 1.1% were Muslim, 0.9% were Buddhist and 11.0% had other religions.

Of those at least 15 years old, 276 (18.9%) people had a bachelor's or higher degree, and 306 (20.9%) people had no formal qualifications. The median income was $22,500, compared with $31,800 nationally. 69 people (4.7%) earned over $70,000 compared to 17.2% nationally. The employment status of those at least 15 was that 615 (42.0%) people were employed full-time, 207 (14.1%) were part-time, and 96 (6.6%) were unemployed.

References

Suburbs of Rotorua
Populated places in the Bay of Plenty Region